The Patriot League women's basketball tournament is the annual conference women's basketball championship tournament for the NCAA Division I Patriot League. The tournament has been held annually since 1991. It is a single-elimination tournament and seeding is based on regular season records.

The tournament champion receives the conference's automatic bid to the NCAA Women's Division I Basketball Championship.

Results

Championships by school

 Schools highlighted in pink are former members of the Patriot League.
 Boston University, Lafayette, and Loyola Maryland have not yet won a Patriot League tournament.

See also
 Patriot League men's basketball tournament

References